Philippe Meyer may refer to:
 Philippe Meyer (politician) (born 1969), French politician
 Philippe Meyer (swimmer) (born 1971), Swiss swimmer